I Know Where I'm Going! is a 1945 romance film by the British-based filmmakers Michael Powell and Emeric Pressburger. It stars Wendy Hiller and Roger Livesey, and features Pamela Brown and Finlay Currie.

Plot
Joan Webster is a 25-year-old middle-class Englishwoman with an ambitious, independent spirit. She knows where she's going, or at least she thinks she does. She travels from her home in Manchester to the Hebrides to marry Sir Robert Bellinger, a wealthy, much older industrialist, on the (fictitious) Isle of Kiloran.

When bad weather postpones the final leg of her journey (the boat trip to Kiloran), she is forced to wait it out on the Isle of Mull, among a community of people whose values are quite different from hers. There she meets Torquil MacNeil, a naval officer trying to go home to Kiloran while on shore leave. They are sheltered for the night in the nearby home of Torquil's friend, Catriona Potts. Joan suggests to Catriona that she could sell her property to get money. Catriona replies, "money isn't everything."

The next day, on their way to catch a bus to Tobermory to find a telephone, they come upon the ruins of Moy Castle. Joan wants to take a look inside, but Torquil refuses to go in. When she reminds him that the terrible curse associated with it only applies to the laird of Kiloran, Torquil introduces himself: he is the laird, and Bellinger has only leased his island. On the bus, the locals recount several disparaging stories about Bellinger. At the coastguard station in Tobermory, Joan is able to contact Bellinger on Kiloran. She and Torquil stay at the Western Isles Hotel in Tobermory. She asks him to eat at a separate table to avert gossip. As the bad weather worsens into a full-scale gale, Torquil spends more time with Joan, who becomes increasingly torn between her ambition and her growing attraction to him.

When Joan visits Achnacroish, she is surprised to re-encounter Torquil, who feigns not to know her in the presence of others, among them Bellinger's friends. She and Torquil attend a ceilidh celebrating a couple's diamond wedding anniversary. The bagpipers hired to play at Joan's wedding perform at the ceilidh.

Desperate to salvage her carefully laid plans, Joan tries to persuade Ruairidh Mhór to take her to Kiloran immediately, but he knows conditions are far too dangerous. Joan manages to bribe Ruairidh Mhór's young assistant, Kenny, into attempting it by offering him £20: enough money to buy a half-share in Ruairidh's boat and marry Ruairidh's daughter Bridie. Torquil learns of the scheme and tries to talk Joan out of it, but she is adamant. When Catriona tells Torquil that Joan is actually running away from him, he races to the quayside and invites himself aboard. En route, the boat's engine is flooded and they are nearly caught in the Corryvreckan whirlpool, but Torquil is able to restart the motor just in time, and they return safely to Mull.

At last the weather clears. Joan asks Torquil for a parting kiss before they go their separate ways. Torquil enters Moy Castle, and the curse takes effect almost immediately. Centuries earlier, Torquil's ancestor had stormed the castle to capture his unfaithful wife and her lover. He had them bound together and cast into a water-filled dungeon with only a small stone to stand on. When their strength gave out, they dragged each other into the water, but not before she placed a curse on the lairds of Kiloran. From the battlements, Torquil sees Joan, accompanied by the three bagpipers, marching resolutely toward him. The couple meet in the castle, and embrace. An inscription describes the curse: if a MacNeil of Kiloran dares step over the threshold of Moy, he shall be chained to a woman to the end of his days, "and will die in his chains".

Torquil and Joan walk away together along the lane arm in arm. "I Know Where I'm Going" is sung as the end credits roll.

Cast

 Wendy Hiller as Joan Webster
 Roger Livesey as Torquil MacNeil aka Kiloran
 Pamela Brown as Catriona Potts
 Finlay Currie as Ruairidh Mhór
 George Carney as Mr Webster
 Nancy Price as Mrs Crozier
 Catherine Lacey as Mrs Robinson, a chatterbox friend of Bellinger's who is on holiday in the area
 Jean Cadell as the Postmistress
 John Laurie as John Campbell, son of the couple whose diamond anniversary céilidh Torquil and Joan attend
 Valentine Dyall as Mr. Robinson, a business associate of Bellinger's and Mrs. Robinson's husband
 Norman Shelley as Sir Robert Bellinger (voice)
 Margot Fitzsimons as Bridie
 Murdo Morrison as Kenny
 Captain C.W.R. Knight as Colonel Barnstaple, falconer and friend of Torquil and Catriona
 Walter Hudd as Hunter, one of Bellinger's employees
 Mr Ramshaw as Torquil, the Eagle
 John Rae as Old Shepherd
 Anthony Eustrel as Hooper
 Herbert Lomas as Mr Campbell
 Graham Moffatt as RAF Sergeant
 Petula Clark as Cheril, the precocious daughter of the Robinsons
Making their third appearance in I Know Where I'm Going! were director Michael Powell's golden cocker spaniels Erik and Spangle, who had previously appeared in Contraband (1940) and The Life and Death of Colonel Blimp (1943), and went on to be seen in Powell and Pressburger's A Matter of Life and Death, also known as Stairway to Heaven (1946).

Production

Development
Powell and Pressburger wanted to make A Matter of Life and Death but filming was held up because they wanted to do the film in colour and there was a shortage of colour cameras. (Technicolor cameras and technical specialists were mostly in Hollywood during the Second World War.)

Pressburger suggested that instead they make a film that was part of the "crusade against materialism", a theme they had tackled in A Canterbury Tale, only in a more accessible romantic comedy format.

The story was originally called The Misty Island. Pressburger wanted to make a film about a girl who wants to get to an island, but by the end of the film no longer wants to. Powell suggested an island on Scotland's west coast. He and Pressburger spent several weeks researching locations and decided on the Isle of Mull.

Pressburger wrote the screenplay in four days. "It just burst out, you couldn't hold back," he said.

The movie was originally meant to star Deborah Kerr and James Mason but Kerr could not get out of her contract with MGM, so they cast Wendy Hiller. Hiller was originally cast in the three roles Kerr played in The Life and Death of Colonel Blimp but had to withdraw because she got pregnant.

Six weeks before filming, Mason pulled out of the movie, saying he did not want to go on location. Roger Livesey read the script and asked to play the role. Powell thought he was too old and portly but Livesey lost "ten or twelve pounds" (four or five kilos) and lightened his hair; Powell was convinced, but Livesey was appearing in a West End play, The Banbury Nose, during the shoot, so he was unable to go on location.

Filming
Shooting took place on the Isle of Mull and at Denham Studios.

It was the second and last collaboration between the co-directors and cinematographer Erwin Hillier (who shot the entire film without a light meter).

From various topographical references and a map briefly shown in the film, it is clear that the Isle of Kiloran is based on Colonsay. The name Kiloran was borrowed from one of Colonsay's bays, Kiloran Bay. The heroine of the film is trying to get to "Kiloran" (Colonsay), but nobody ever gets there. No footage was shot on Colonsay.

One of the most complex scenes shows the small boat battling the Corryvreckan whirlpool. This was a combination of footage shot at Corryvreckan between the Hebridean islands of Scarba and Jura, and Bealach a'Choin Ghlais (Sound of the Grey Dogs) between Scarba and Lunga.
There are some long-distance shots looking down over the area, shot from one of the islands.
There are some middle-distance and close-up shots that were made from a small boat with a hand-held camera.
There were some model shots, done in the tank at the studio. These had gelatin added to the water so that it would hold its shape better and would look better when scaled up. 
The close-up shots of the people in the boat were all done in the studio, with a boat on gimbals being rocked in all directions by some hefty studio hands while others threw buckets of water at them. These were filmed with the shots made from the boat with the hand-held camera projected behind them.
Further trickery joined some of the long- and middle-distance shots together with those made in the tank into a single frame.

Though much of the film was shot in the Hebrides, Livesey was not able to travel to Scotland because he was performing in a West End play, The Banbury Nose by Peter Ustinov, at the time of filming. Thus all his scenes were shot in the studio at Denham, and a double (coached by Livesey in London) was used in all of his scenes shot in Scotland. These were then mixed so that the same scene would often have a middle-distance shot of the double and then a closeup of Livesey, or a shot of the double's back followed by a shot showing Livesey's face.

The film was budgeted at £200,000 and went £30,000 over. The actors received £50,000, of which one third went to Hiller. The whirlpool cost £40,000.

Powell shot a scene at the end of the film where Catriona follows Torquil into the castle, to emphasise her love for him, but decided to cut it.

Music
John Laurie was the choreographer and arranger for the cèilidh sequences. The puirt à beul "Macaphee" was performed by Boyd Steven, Maxwell Kennedy and Jean Houston of the Glasgow Orpheus Choir. The song sung at the cèilidh that Torquil translates for Joan is a traditional Gaelic song "Ho ro, mo nighean donn bhòidheach", originally translated into English as "Ho ro My Nut Brown Maiden" by John Stuart Blackie in 1882. It is also played by three pipers marching toward Moy Castle at the start of the final scene. The film's other music is traditional Scottish and Irish songs and original music by Allan Gray.

Locations
 On the Isle of Mull
 Carsaig Bay – Carsaig Pier and boathouses, Carsaig House (Erraig), telephone box next to the waterfall.
 Moy Castle – Castle of Moy
 Duart Castle – Castle of Sorne
 Torosay Castle – Achnacroish
 Gulf of Corryvreckan – the whirlpool

Reception

Box office
The film was a hit at the box office and recovered its cost in the UK alone.

U.S. release
The film was one of the first five movies from the Rank Organisation to receive a release in the U.S. under a new arrangement. The others were Caesar and Cleopatra, The Rake's Progress, Brief Encounter and The Wicked Lady.

Reviews
The film has received accolades from many critics:
"I've never seen a picture which smelled of the wind and rain in quite this way nor one which so beautifully exploited the kind of scenery people actually live with, rather than the kind which is commercialised as a show place." —Raymond Chandler, Letters.
"The cast makes the best possible use of some natural, unforced dialogue, and there is some glorious outdoor photography." —The Times, 14 November 1945
"[It] has interest and integrity.  It deserves to have successors." —The Guardian, 16 November 1945
"I reached the point of thinking there were no more masterpieces to discover, until I saw I Know Where I'm Going!" —Martin Scorsese
The film critic Barry Norman included it among his 100 greatest films of all time.
The film critic Molly Haskell included it among her 10 greatest films of all time in the 2012 Sight & Sound poll.

Pressburger said that, when he visited Paramount Pictures in 1947, the head of the script department told him they considered the film's screenplay perfect and frequently watched it for inspiration.

See also
 Leap Year, a 2010 film loosely based on I Know Where I'm Going

References

Notes

Bibliography

External links
 
 
 
 . Full synopsis and film stills (and clips viewable from UK libraries).
 Reviews and articles at the Powell & Pressburger Pages
I Know Where I’m Going! an essay by Ian Christie at the Criterion Collection
 . A documentary about the people and places in the film.
 I Know Where I'm Going! resource page.
Review of film at Variety

DVD reviews
Region 1
Review by DVD Savant
Review by Megan Ratner at Bright Lights

Region 2
I Know Where I'm Going! Review from Noel Megahey at The Digital Fix
Review (in French) at DVD Classik (France)

1945 films
British black-and-white films
British romantic drama films
Films shot at Denham Film Studios
Films by Powell and Pressburger
Films set in Scotland
Films set on islands
Scottish Gaelic-language films
1945 romantic drama films
1940s English-language films
1940s British films